He's Coming to Me, also known as Come to Me, is a 2019 Thai television series starring Prachaya Ruangroj (Singto) and Pawat Chittsawangdee (Ohm).

Directed by Aof Noppharnach and produced by GMMTV, the series was one of the thirteen television series for 2019 launched by GMMTV in their "Wonder Th13teen" event on 5 November 2018. It premiered on LINE TV on 7 March 2019, airing on Thursdays at 20:00 ICT. The series concluded on 25 April 2019.

Synopsis 
Med (Prachaya Ruangroj) died over 20 years ago with no one ever looking after his grave. Now, living as a ghost, all he does is sit and lie all day waiting for someone to visit him during the Qingming day — an event which happens only once in every year. Until one day, a boy named Thun (Nattapat Nimjirawat), together with his father, visits the cemetery. He comes across Med's untended grave and decides to offer some food. He promises to come back every year until Med discovers that the now teenage Thun (Pawat Chittsawangdee) can actually see him. Thun's attention makes Med feel good about their relationship through their travels until such time that he gets to stay in Thun's dorm. Despite living in two different worlds, Thun's affection towards him fuels his desire to find out the truth on the mystery surrounding his death.

Cast and characters 
Below are the cast of the series:

Main 
 Prachaya Ruangroj (Singto) as Wongsakorn "Med" Thanarungsiri
 Pawat Chittsawangdee (Ohm) as teenage Thun Thunyakorn
 Nattapat Nimjirawat (Mac) as child Thun Thunyakorn

Supporting 
 Wachirawit Ruangwiwat (Chimon) as Prince
 Harit Cheewagaroon (Sing) as Khiaokhiem
 Sarocha Burintr (Gigie) as Praifah "Prai" Thanarungsiri
 Intira Jaroenpura as adult Kwan Thunyakorn
 Pattranite Limpatiyakorn (Love) as teenage Kwan Thunyakorn
 Chanagun Arpornsutinan (Gunsmile) as Jeng
 Suttatip Wutchaipradit (Ampere) as Ngoon
 Sivakorn Lertchuchot (Guy) as Chin
 Chayapol Jutamat (AJ) as JJ
 Chayakorn Jutamat (JJ) as Eak
 Ohmda Piyawahnit as Nom
 Suchao Phongwilai as Prai's Grandfather

Soundtracks

International broadcast 
Philippines – Dubbed in Filipino under the title "Come To Me", the series was streamed on iWantTFC, owned and operated by ABS-CBN Corporation. The first four episodes were released on 8 August 2020, while the last four episodes were released on 15 August 2020.

Awards and nominations

Notes

References

External links 
 He's Coming to Me on GMM 25 website 
 He's Coming to Me  on LINE TV
 
 GMMTV

Television series by GMMTV
Thai romantic fantasy television series
Thai romantic comedy television series
Thai drama television series
2019 Thai television series debuts
2019 Thai television series endings
Line TV original programming
Thai boys' love television series
2010s LGBT-related comedy television series